Patrick Bowden (born 4 August 1981) is a former Australian rules footballer in the Australian Football League.

Football career

Western Bulldogs
In the 1999 National AFL Draft, Bowden was a fourth-round selection (no. 58 overall) to the Western Bulldogs. With limited opportunities at the Bulldogs, he was traded at the end of the 2005 AFL season to the Richmond Football Club in return for the 55th pick in the 2005 AFL Draft, which the Bulldogs used to select Brett Montgomery.

Richmond Football Club
In the 2006 AFL season, Bowden had his best season to date. He led Richmond's list for marks and was equal fourth for marks in the competition.

He was the fourth in his family to pull on the yellow-and-black (after father Michael and brothers Sean and Joel).

After a year full of injury and poor form, the Tigers delisted Bowden at the end of season 2007.

External links

1981 births
Living people
Richmond Football Club players
Western Bulldogs players
Australian rules footballers from the Northern Territory
Coburg Football Club players
People from Alice Springs